The Oceania Masters Athletics (OMA) is a regional body of World Masters Athletics,

responsible for organizing masters athletics championship competitions for athletes from the countries of Oceania. It was founded in 1984 as Oceania Association of Veteran Athletes (OAVA) or Oceania Association of Master Athletes (OAMA);

the name was formally changed to OMA in 2012.

All athletes 35 years of age or older are eligible to compete. The biennial Championships are held in alternate years with the WMA Outdoor Championships.

History

References

External links

Athletics organizations
Masters athletics (track and field)
Masters athletics (track and field) competitions
Biennial athletics competitions